Australian Christian College – Darling Downs is a Christian co-educational school, located in Brookdale, a suburb of Perth, Western Australia. The school has grades ranging from Kindergarten to Year 6.

The school is owned and operated by Christian Education Ministries Ltd and is a member of the Association of Independent Schools of Western Australia.

The principal, Jacqui Burrage, previously worked in leadership positions at a number of Christian schools in Western Australia. Most students who attend the school reside in the southeast corridor of Perth, with a school bus service available.

Enrolment
Enrolment is open to all, but non-Christian students must accept the school's Christian teaching and ethos.

Australian Christian College – Darling Downs is one of six Australian Christian Colleges.

References

External links
Official school website
Christian Education Ministries Ltd
Association of Independent Schools of Western Australia

2012 establishments in Australia
Educational institutions established in 2012
Darling Downs
Nondenominational Christian schools in Perth, Western Australia
Private primary schools in Perth, Western Australia